Xyanide Resurrection is a shoot 'em up video game developed by Playlogic Entertainment and published by Playlogic and Ertain for the PC Windows, PlayStation 2 and PlayStation Portable in 2007–2008 in Europe and Japan. It is a sequel to 2006's Xyanide.

Gameplay

Plot
Xyanide Resurrection takes place after the events of the first Xyanide, as the space witch Aguira is still alive and the protagonist Drake fights to hunt her down in alternate dimension who she has escaped to.

Reception
The game received generally poor or average reviews.

References

External links

Xyanide: Resurrection at MobyGames

2007 video games
PlayStation 2 games
PlayStation Portable games
Science fantasy video games
Shoot 'em ups
Video game sequels
Video games developed in the Netherlands
Windows games
Video games about witchcraft
Playlogic Entertainment games
Multiplayer and single-player video games
Evolved Games games